LHM or lhm may refer to:

 Left-handed material, in negative-index metamaterial
 Liquide hydraulique minéral, for hydropneumatic suspension
 Central Tibetan language (ISO 639 code:lhm)
 Lutheran Hour Ministries, a Christian outreach ministry
 Larry Hedrick Motorsports, a former NASCAR team 
 Lincoln Regional Airport (California) (FAA LID code: LHM), California, US
 Le Mans Hypercar the top tier of closed wheel racecars.